Mehdi Sohrabi (born 12 October 1981) is an Iranian professional racing cyclist, who is currently suspended from the sport following an anti-doping rule violation.

Career
Sohrabi was born in Zanjan, Iran. In 2010 and 2011, Sohrabi won the UCI Asia Tour. At the end of the 2011 season, Sohrabi had many UCI-points, and because of this was contracted by UCI ProTeam , that needed these points to secure their ProTeam status for the next season.

Major results

2005
 National Road Championships
1st  Road race
1st  Time trial
 1st Stage 4 Kerman Tour
2006
 1st Road race, Asian Road Championships
 2nd Road race, Asian Games
 4th Overall Kerman Tour
2007
 1st  Overall Jelajah Malaysia
1st Asian rider classification
 Kerman Tour
1st Stages 5 & 7
 1st Stage 1 Tour de East Java
 1st Stage 6 Tour de Hokkaido
 6th Overall Tour of Azerbaijan (Iran)
2008
 2nd Overall International Presidency Tour
1st Stage 2
 3rd Overall Jelajah Negeri Sembilan
1st Stages 2 & 3
 6th Road race, Asian Road Championships
 7th Overall Tour of Azerbaijan (Iran)
1st Stages 1, 5 & 6
2009
 1st  Time trial, National Road Championships
 1st Overall Tour de Indonesia
1st Points classification
1st Mountains classification
1st Stages 1 (TTT) & 6
 1st Overall Milad De Nour Tour
1st Stages 2 & 4
 1st Stage 4 International Azerbaïjan Tour
 6th Overall Presidential Cycling Tour Of Iran
 6th Overall Tour de East Java
1st Points classification
 8th Overall Jelajah Malaysia
1st Stage 2
2010
 1st Road race, Asian Road Championships
 1st  Road race, National Road Championships
 1st Stage 7 Tour de Singkarak
 Tour of Qinghai Lake
1st Stages 6 & 9
2011
 1st  Overall Jelajah Malaysia
1st  Asian rider classification
1st Stages 1 & 6
 1st Overall Kerman Tour
1st Stages 1, 2, 3, 4 & 5
 1st Overall International Azerbaïjan Tour
1st Stage 3
 1st Stage 4 International Presidency Tour
 1st Stage 3 Tour de Taiwan
 1st Stage 7 Tour of Qinghai Lake
 2nd Time trial, National Road Championships
 6th Overall Milad De Nour Tour
2012
 2nd Road race, Asian Road Championships
2013
 Tour of Borneo
1st Stages 2 & 5
 1st Stage 3 Tour de Filipinas
 1st Stage 7 Tour de Singkarak
2014
 1st Stage 4 Tour de Ijen
 6th Road race, Asian Road Championships
2015
 1st Stage 3 Tour de Singkarak
 10th Road race, National Road Championships
2016
 National Road Championships
1st  Road race
4th Time trial
 10th Overall Tour of Iran (Azerbaijan)
2017
 National Road Championships
1st  Road race
5th Time trial

2018
Asian Road Championships
2nd Team time trial
3rd Road race
2019
1st  Road race, National Road Championships

References

External links

1981 births
Living people
Iranian male cyclists
Iranian track cyclists
Cyclists at the 2004 Summer Olympics
Cyclists at the 2008 Summer Olympics
Cyclists at the 2012 Summer Olympics
Olympic cyclists of Iran
People from Zanjan, Iran
Asian Games silver medalists for Iran
Asian Games bronze medalists for Iran
Asian Games medalists in cycling
Cyclists at the 2002 Asian Games
Cyclists at the 2006 Asian Games
Cyclists at the 2010 Asian Games
Cyclists at the 2014 Asian Games
Cyclists at the 2018 Asian Games
Tour of Azerbaijan (Iran) winners
Medalists at the 2002 Asian Games
Medalists at the 2006 Asian Games
Medalists at the 2010 Asian Games
21st-century Iranian people